Tomahawk is a theatre company based in Oxford, South East England. Founded in 2005 by Alex Nicholls and Oliver Baird  among others, experienced personnel work alongside young actors, directors and technicians, many of whom have gone on to train in London at the Royal Academy of Dramatic Art (RADA), London Academy of Music and Dramatic Art (LAMDA) and Mountview Academy of Theatre Arts.

Productions
Macbeth (William Shakespeare) December 2005
Little Eyolf (Henrik Ibsen) June 2006
The Winter's Tale (William Shakespeare) December 2006
The Importance of Being Earnest (Oscar Wilde) June 2007
 Much Ado About Nothing (William Shakespeare) December 2007
Hedda Gabler (Henrik Ibsen) June 2008
The Tempest (William Shakespeare) December 2008
Gaslight (Patrick Hamilton) June 2009
The Importance of Being Earnest (Oscar Wilde) December 2009
Twelfth Night (William Shakespeare) June/July 2010
Midsummer Nights Dream (William Shakespeare) June/July 2011
Romeo and Juliet (William Shakespeare) June/July 2012
Macbeth (William Shakespeare) June/July 2013
Midsummer Nights Dream (William Shakespeare) July 2014
Romeo and Juliet (William Shakespeare) July 2015
Much Ado About Nothing (William Shakespeare) July 2016
Romeo and Juliet (William Shakespeare) July 2017
Midsummer Nights Dream (William Shakespeare) July 2018
Macbeth (William Shakespeare) July 2019

Theatres
Tomahawk have performed at a number of local and regional theatres:

The North Wall Arts Centre, Oxford
The Kenton Theatre, Henley-on-Thames
Burton Taylor Theatre, Oxford
The Old Fire Station Studio, Oxford
The Oxford Castle Courtyard
Taganrog Chekhov Drama Theater, Taganrog, Russia

Tours include:

Hedda Gabler - Westacre River Studios, Norfolk – June 2008
The Tempest - Udine, Italy - February/March 2009
The Importance of Being Earnest - Udine, Italy - February 2010
The Importance of Being Earnest - Taganrog, Russia - May 2010
Macbeth - Udine, Italy - April 2013

References

External links

Tomahawk Theatre Website
North Wall Theatre
The Kenton Theatre
Old Fire Station Studio
Burton Taylor Theatre
Westacre Theatre

Theatre production companies
Theatre in Oxford
2005 in theatre
2005 establishments in England
Arts organizations established in 2005